The following is a list of dams in Gifu Prefecture, Japan.

List

See also

References 

Gifu